Korean fortresses are fortifications constructed by Koreans since the Three Kingdoms of Korea period. Koreans developed a unique and distinct fortress tradition. Korea, beginning with Goguryeo, has been called "a country of fortresses"; almost 2,400 mountain fortress sites have been found in Korea.

There are numerous types of Korean fortresses, including sanseong (mountain fortress), eupseong (city fortress), pyeongjiseong, gwanseong, jangseong, chaekseong, and more.

History
Korean fortresses were based on a stone culture and built with stones on natural mountainous terrain; therefore, they are conceptually completely different compared to Chinese fortresses, which were based on an earth culture and built with bricks and stamped earth on flat land. Korean fortresses were invented by Goguryeo and spread to Baekje and Silla, and then inherited and further developed by Goryeo and then Joseon.

Sites
Almost 2,400 mountain fortress sites have been found in Korea.

Goguryeo fortress ruins have been found in about 170 sites to date, including in China; one of the most notable among them is Ansi Fortress, which successfully defended against Tang Taizong during the Goguryeo–Tang War. Goguryeo fortress ruins have also been found in present-day Mongolia.

Korean-style fortresses can be found in Japan, which were constructed and supervised by immigrants of Baekje origin.

UNESCO
Hwaseong Fortress and Namhansanseong are UNESCO World Heritage Sites.

List and Classification
List of fortresses in Korea
List of Korean fortresses in China
Korean-style fortresses in Japan
Japanese castles in Korea
Cheolli Jangseong

Gallery

References

Fortifications in Korea
Forts
Architecture in Korea
Buildings and structures in Korea
Goguryeo
Korean culture
History of Korea

External links
 Korean Mountain Fortresses